Otto Fritz Harder (Nickname: Tull Harder; 25 November 1892 – 4 March 1956) was a German footballer and convicted war criminal who played for Eintracht Braunschweig, Hamburger SV, and Victoria Hamburg. He won two German football championships and played 15 times in the Germany national team. Harder was a former SS officer and had been a warder at the Ahlem concentration camp in Hanover.

Career
Harder was born in Braunschweig. He spent most of his career with Hamburger SV, scoring over 378 goals in 211 games. His football fame in Germany was comparable with Uwe Seeler's fame.

At the age of 16 he was discovered for football by FC Hohenzollern Braunschweig, and his impact was such that not even twelve months passed before the main club in the city, Eintracht Braunschweig, incorporated him into his ranks. There he received the nickname of "Tull" with which he would be known throughout his career, since his style of play was reminiscent of that of Tottenham Hotspur's center forward at the time, Walter Tull, the first black professional English player who died in action during World War I.

Initially, and since he was barely 17 years old, the young Tull Harder was only called up to play friendly matches with the Eintracht Braunschweig reserve team, which made him nervous, although this situation would not last long, since his quality and his tremendous physique ended up prevailing and he managed to make a career, as they say. At the beginning of 1912 he left for Hamburger SV for a few months. Eintracht Braunschweig fans wanted to avoid the departure of their young star at all costs. For this reason, they did not let him take the train to Hamburg, which he had to do almost secretly 25 kilometers from there, at the station in the neighboring town of Peine. Ultimately, Harder would play one more season with his hometown team before finally committing to Hamburger SV to play on the banks of the Elbe.

After the Great War, Harder soon established himself as the team's great star. Through him, Hamburger SV became one of the great German soccer teams in the 1920s, first reaching the 1922 German football championship against 1.FC Nürnberg, which officially did not have a champion, and finally making up for it. a year later, in 1923, the year in which Hamburger SV lifted its first German championship title after defeating Union Oberschöneweide by a clear 3–0. He would repeat that success in 1928, when he was already 36 years old. That season he established a record for eternity by scoring, on 15 January 1928, Otto scored no less than 12 goals against  with the final score was 18–5.

Career statistics

Later life
Following his football career, Harder ran an insurance agency, and in October 1932, he became a member of the NSDAP, before joining the SS in May 1933. In August 1939, he was drafted into the Waffen-SS, and served shortly at Sachsenhausen concentration camp, then at Neuengamme in Hamburg by the end of that year. In November 1944, Harder was an SS-Untersturmführer (equivalent second lieutenant) and a commander (Schutzhaftlagerführer) at the Ahlem camp in Hanover. After World War II, Harder was convicted of war crimes by the British military court at the Curio house in Rotherbaum. He was sentenced to 15 years' imprisonment. After the trial the Hamburger SV excluded him for a short time. In 1951 His Majesty's Government pardoned Harder. Harder moved to Bendestorf.

Harder died in a hospital in Hamburg after surgery in 1956. The Hamburger SV published an obituary 
 'He was (...) always a good friend and faithful comrade.'

For the 1974 FIFA World Cup, the senate of Hamburg published the booklet Hamburg '74. Fußballweltmeisterschaft, which praised among others Josef Posipal, Uwe Seeler and Harder as role models for the young. The sheets mentioning Harder were removed.

Honours
Eintracht Braunschweig
Duchy/Free State of Brunswick championship: 1909–10, 1910–11, 1911–12, 1912–13

Northern German championship: 1912–13

Hamburger SV
Hamburg Championship: 1918–19, 1922–23, 1923–24, 1924–25, 1925–26, 1926–27, 1927–28, 1929–30, 1930–31

Northern German champions: 1921, 1922, 1923, 1924, 1925, 1928, 1929, 1931.

German champion: 1922, 1923, 1928

North German Cup: 1926

International career
Scores and results list Germany's goal tally first, score column indicates score after each Harder goal.

References

Further reading
 Repplinger, Roger (2008) Leg dich, Zigeuner. Die Geschichte von Johann Trollmann und Tull Harder. München, Piper,

External links

1892 births
1956 deaths
Sportspeople from Braunschweig
German footballers
Footballers from Lower Saxony
Association football forwards
Germany international footballers
Eintracht Braunschweig players
Hamburger SV players
SC Victoria Hamburg players
Neuengamme concentration camp personnel
People convicted in the Curiohaus trials
SS-Untersturmführer
Waffen-SS personnel
Schutzhaftlagerführer